Sigrún Hjálmtýsdóttir (born 8 August 1955), better known as Diddú, is an Icelandic soprano and songwriter. Educated at the Reykjavík College of Music and the Guildhall School of Music and Drama in London, she began her singing career in the 1970s as a vocalist for the popular folk and pop group Spilverk Þjóðanna. She subsequently turned to classical music, particularly Lieder and operas.

Diddú's most recent album, Hvert Örstutt Spor (Each Tiny Step), was released in 2005.

Early life and education
The second of seven children of Hjálmtýr E. Hjálmtýsson, a bank clerk, and Margrét Matthíasdóttir, a writer, Diddú was born on 8 August 1955 and raised in Reykjavík. She studied at the Reykjavík College of Music, and afterwards at the Guildhall School of Music and Drama in London where she received a degree (1979–1984) and a postgraduate diploma (1985). She also had private singing lessons in Italy between 1987 and 1988.

Career

Diddú began her singing career as a vocalist with the folk and pop group Spilverk Þjóðanna between 1975 and 1978 and made numerous recordings of folk and popular music, before turning her focus to classical music, particularly Lieder and operas. With the Icelandic Opera she has performed the parts of Susanna in The Marriage of Figaro, Gilda in Rigoletto, Papagena and the Queen of the Night in The Magic Flute, Lucia in Lucia di Lammermoor, Violetta in La traviata, Adina in L'elisir d'amore and Rosalinda in Die Fledermaus. She was a guest singer as Susanna in The Marriage of Figaro in Trondheim, Norway, and as Gilda in Rigoletto in Gothenburg, Sweden (1992). She has also sung the role of Olympia in Les contes d'Hoffmann at the National Theatre of Iceland in Reykjavík.

In 1994, Diddú appeared in Bíódagar (Movie Days) by Icelandic film director Friðrik Þór Friðriksson, playing the mother of a young boy living in the 1950s who is engrossed with American movies.

In 2001, Diddú performed at a special concert in Beijing, China, in the Forbidden City Concert Hall. The concert was held to commemorate 30 years of relations between Iceland and China.

On 26 September 2007, Diddú was a special guest of Garðar Thór Cortes at a concert at the Barbican Centre in London with the National Symphony Orchestra conducted by Cortes's father, Garðar Cortes. She performed "Il Bacio" ("The Kiss"), "Mein Herr Marquis" from Johann Strauss II's Die Fledermaus, the cavatina "Casta diva" from Bellini's Norma, and "É strano... sempre libera" from Verdi's La traviata; and sang in duet with Garðar Thór Cortes in "O soave fanciulla" from Puccini's La bohème, in a duet from act 1, scene 5, of Verdi's Rigoletto, and in "The Prayer" by Carole Bayer Sager.

Personal life
Diddú's husband is musician Þorkell Jóelsson (born 28 May 1952). Her father, Hjálmtýr E. Hjálmtýsson (5 July 1933 – 12 September 2002), had roles in the Icelandic comedies Með allt á hreinu (On Top, 1982), Löggulíf (A Policeman's Life, 1985) and Karlakórinn Hekla (The Men's Choir, 1992). Diddú's youngest brother, Páll Óskar Hjálmtýsson, is a pop singer, songwriter and disc jockey.

Selected works

Discography

Sigrún Hjálmtýsdóttir Sópran (1992)
Töfrar (Magic, 1994)
Jólastjarna (Christmas Star, 1997)
Klassík (Classical, 1998)
Ljós Og Skuggar (Light and Shadows, 2000)
Óskastund (A Moment for a Wish, 2001)
Fuglar Tímans (Birds of Time, 2003)
Hvert Örstutt Spor (Each Tiny Step, 2005)

Notes

Sources

Diddú at 12 Tónar. Retrieved 30 October 2007.

Further reading

External links
Diddú (Sigrún Hjálmtýsdóttir) at the Church of Akureyri website. In Icelandic.
Diddú (Sigrún Hjálmtýsdóttir) at the Félag  Íslenska Leikara (Icelandic Actors Association) website. In Icelandic.
.
Diddú (Sigrún Hjálmtýsdóttir) at the Íslenska óperan (Icelandic Opera) website. In Icelandic.
Diddú (Sigrún Hjálmtýsdóttir) at the website of Salurinn concert hall in Kopavogur, Iceland. In Icelandic.
Diddú (Sigrún Hjálmtýsdóttir) at Tónlist.is, an on-line portal for Icelandic music. In Icelandic.
Diddú at Tonlist.com, the English version of Tónlist.is.
Diddú performing at the National Theatre of Iceland, broadcast on the US radio variety show A Prairie Home Companion with Garrison Keillor on 20 May 2006.

Icelandic operatic sopranos
20th-century Icelandic actresses
Reykjavík College of Music alumni
Alumni of the Guildhall School of Music and Drama
1955 births
Living people
Icelandic film actresses
Knights of the Order of the Falcon